Middleton Island Airport  is a public-use airport located on Middleton Island, which is located in the Gulf of Alaska, approximately  southwest of Cordova, Alaska.

Facilities and aircraft 
Middleton Island Airport covers an area of 5,500 acres (2,226 ha) at an elevation of 100 feet (30 m) above mean sea level. It has two runways: 1/19 is 3,158 by 115 feet (963 x 35 m) with a gravel surface; 12/30 is 1,500 by 125 feet (457 x 38 m) with a gravel and dirt surface. For the 12-month period ending December 31, 2005, the airport had 150 aircraft operations, an average of 12 per month: 67% air taxi and 33% general aviation.

References

External links
 FAA Alaska airport diagram (GIF)
 Topographic map from USGS The National Map
 

Airports in Chugach Census Area, Alaska